Paddys Green is a rural locality in the Shire of Mareeba, Queensland, Australia.

Geography
Granite Creek forms the south-eastern boundary. 
Hann Tableland National Park is in the north-west of the locality.

Road infrastructure
Mareeba Dimbulah Road (State Route 27) runs through the south of the locality.

References 

Shire of Mareeba
Localities in Queensland